Ex Deo is a Canadian death metal band formed in Montreal, Quebec in 2008. The band is a side project of Kataklysm frontman Maurizio Iacono, and is based on the history of the Roman Empire.

History

Ex Deo was formed in 2008 as an artistic project of Maurizio Iacono, who is of Italian heritage. It became the first Roman Legion melodic death metal band; in performance, band members wear modified Roman Legion uniforms.

Romulus (2009)
Ex Deo's debut album Romulus was released in Europe and North America in June 2009, on Nuclear Blast. The album was recorded with producer and Kataklysm guitarist Jean-François Dagenais, featuring guest appearances by Karl Sanders (Nile), Obsidian C. (Keep of Kalessin) and Nergal (Behemoth). It was generally well-received. The band toured in support of it, playing Hellfest in France, FortaRock Festival in Holland, Paganfest in Germany and a group concert in New York. 

In December 14, 2010, the band parted with Nuclear Blast and signed a new record deal with Napalm Records.

Caligvla (2012–2014)
Ex Deo's second album Caligvla, was released on August 31, 2012, Caligula's 2000th anniversary. The album features guest appearances by Seth Siro (Spiros Antoniou) (Septicflesh), Mariangela Demurtas (Tristania), Stefano Fiori (Graveworm) and Francesco Artusato (All Shall Perish) and was well-received by critics. 

In June 2012, the band released the video for the song I, Caligvla (featuring Maurizio's girlfriend and Colombian model Suzzy), and went on tour with Septicflesh, which Iacono was then managing. In addition to numerous North American dates, they played Bloodstock Open Air 2013, and were the special guests at the Cardiff show of the "At the Gate of Sethu 2013 European Tour Part II" in September 2013.

Caligvla was nominated for Metal/Hard Music Album of the Year at the Juno Awards of 2013.

The Immortal Wars (2015–2018)
In February 2017, Ex Deo released their third album, The Immortal Wars, which is about the Punic Wars. It also received excellent reviews. In 2018, the band went on a European tour with Ensiferum, playing dates in France, the Netherlands and Denmark, including Royal Metal Fest.

The Thirteen Years of Nero (2021–)
On June 14, 2021, Ex Deo released its fourth album, The Thirteen Years of Nero, about the Roman Emperor Nero. Once again, the band received rave reviews.

Band members

Maurizio Iacono - vocals, bass
Stéphane Barbe – lead guitar
Jean-François Dagenais – rhythm guitar, producer
Dano Apekian – bass guitar
Oli Beaudoin – drums
 Francesco Ferrini – keyboards

Former members
 François Mongrain – bass guitar (2009)
 Max Duhamel – drums
 Jonathan Lefrancois-Leduc – keyboards

Discography
Studio albums
Romulus (2009)
Caligvla (2012)
The Immortal Wars (2017)
The Thirteen Years of Nero (2021)
Singles
"Romulus" (2009)
Split releases
"Romulus" / "Cruise Ship Terror" (2009)
Music videos
Romulus (2010)
The Final War (Battle of Actium) (2010)
I, Caligvla (2012)
Per Oculus Aquila (2012)
The Tiberius Cliff (2012)
The Rise Of Hannibal (2016)
The Roman (2017)
The Philosopher King (2020)
Boudicca (2021)
Imperator (2021)
The Head of the Snake (2021)

References

External links

Encyclopaedia Metallum

Musical groups established in 2008
Canadian death metal musical groups
Musical groups from Montreal
Nuclear Blast artists
2008 establishments in Quebec